Yodel is a delivery service company based in Liverpool, England. It was originally known as the Home Delivery Network, until it acquired the B2B and B2C operations of DHL Express UK and thereafter, rebranded itself as Yodel in May 2010. It is privately owned by the billionaire Frederick Barclay.

History

Home Delivery Network operated as the logistics division of The Very Group, until it demerged in June 2008. It was formed by the merger of Business Express and Reality, the former Littlewoods and Shop Direct delivery companies respectively. Yodel has sorting hubs at Shaw, Hatfield and Wednesbury, and over 45 delivery depots across the UK.

In December 2011, the London Evening Standard carried a story on reports of packages from Yodel being lost or not delivered on time for Christmas. Yodel said that there had been a great increase in December deliveries over the previous two years and that Yodel had delivered over twenty million packages that month, with 999 out of 1000 being delivered on time.

In March 2012, the BBC's Watchdog consumer programme broadcast a segment highly critical of Yodel. In January 2014, Yodel was voted as the worst delivery service in the United Kingdom for the second consecutive year. BBC Watchdog says that it continued to regularly receive reports of bad service after the re branding to Yodel.

In January 2014, Yodel was named the "worst parcel delivery firm" in a poll by MoneySavingExpert.com, of 9,000 people, with 78% of customers rating their experience negatively. Despite this, Yodel continues to be the delivery company of choice for many major retailers in the United Kingdom, largely due to the company's low prices.

The company apologised in November 2015, after one of the firm's couriers had left a parcel on the roof of a customer's home. In February 2016, Yodel was featured in a Dispatches investigation, which aired on Channel 4.

The investigation was entitled Where's My Missing Mail?. The programme sent an undercover reporter to work at Yodel’s Shaw depot as a sorter. The investigation highlighted how parcels had been thrown onto conveyor belts and even thrown between staff members. In May 2019, Yodel announced it would spend £15.2m on its fleet, to reduce the environmental impact of its delivery operations.

Collect+

In February 2011, Collect+ a parcel sending and collection service, was launched as a joint venture between PayPoint and Yodel. This service is available through almost 6,000 of the PayPoint retail network in the UK and allows customers to collect and send packages at their local convenience store. In April 2020, PayPoint announced an agreement with Yodel to take full ownership of 'Collect+.

References

External links
 

Logistics companies of the United Kingdom